Infection prevention & control is the discipline concerned with preventing healthcare-associated infections; a practical rather than academic sub-discipline of epidemiology. In Northern Europe, infection prevention and control is expanded from healthcare into a component in public health, known as "infection protection" (smittevern, smittskydd, Infektionsschutz in the local languages). It is an essential part of the infrastructure of health care. Infection control and hospital epidemiology are akin to public health practice, practiced within the confines of a particular health-care delivery system rather than directed at society as a whole. 

Infection control addresses factors related to the spread of infections within the healthcare setting, whether among patients, from patients to staff, from staff to patients, or among staff. This includes preventive measures such as hand washing, cleaning, disinfecting, sterilizing, and vaccinating. Other aspects include surveillance, monitoring, and investigating and managing suspected outbreaks of infection within a healthcare setting. 

A subsidiary aspect of infection control involves preventing the spread of antimicrobial-resistant organisms such as MRSA.  This in turn connects to the discipline of antimicrobial stewardship—limiting the use of antimicrobials to necessary cases, as increased usage inevitably results in the selection and dissemination of resistant organisms. Antimicrobial medications (aka antimicrobials or anti-infective agents) include antibiotics, antibacterials, antifungals, antivirals and antiprotozoals.

The World Health Organization (WHO) has set up an Infection Prevention and Control (IPC) unit in its Service Delivery and Safety department that publishes related guidelines.

Infection prevention and control
Aseptic technique is a key component of all invasive medical procedures.  Similar control measures are also recommended in any healthcare setting to prevent the spread of infection generally.

Hand hygiene 

Hand hygiene is one of the basic, yet most important steps in IPC (Infection Prevention and Control). Hand hygiene reduces the chances of HAI (Healthcare Associated Infections) drastically at a floor-low cost. Hand hygiene consists of either hand wash(water based) or hand rubs(alcohol based). Hand wash is a solid 7-steps according to the WHO standards, wherein hand rubs are 5-steps.

The American Nurses Association (ANA) and American Association of Nurse Anesthesiology (AANA) have set specific checkpoints for nurses to clean their hands; the checkpoints for nurses include, before patient contact, before putting on protective equipment, before doing procedures, after contact with patient’s skin and surroundings, after contamination of foreign substances, after contact with bodily fluids and wounds, after taking off protective equipment, and after using the restroom. To ensure all before and after checkpoints for hand washing are done, precautions such as hand sanitizer dispensers filled with sodium hypochlorite, alcohol, or hydrogen peroxide, which are three approved disinfectants that kill bacteria, are placed in certain points, and nurses carrying mini hand sanitizer dispensers help increase sanitation in the work field. In cases where equipment is being placed in a container or bin and picked back up, nurses and doctors are required to wash their hands or use alcohol sanitizer before going back to the container to use the same equipment.

Independent studies by Ignaz Semmelweis in 1846 in Vienna and Oliver Wendell Holmes, Sr. in 1843 in Boston established a link between the hands of health care workers and the spread of hospital-acquired disease. The U.S. Centers for Disease Control and Prevention (CDC) state that "It is well documented that the most important measure for preventing the spread of pathogens is effective handwashing". In the developed world, hand washing is mandatory in most health care settings and required by many different regulators.

In the United States, OSHA standards require that employers must provide readily accessible hand washing facilities, and must ensure that employees wash hands and any other skin with soap and water or flush mucous membranes with water as soon as feasible after contact with blood or other potentially infectious materials (OPIM).

In the UK healthcare professionals have adopted the 'Ayliffe Technique', based on the 6 step method developed by Graham Ayliffe, JR Babb and AH Quoraishi.

Drying is an essential part of the hand hygiene process.  In November 2008, a non-peer-reviewed study was presented to the European Tissue Symposium by the University of Westminster, London, comparing the bacteria levels present after the use of paper towels, warm air hand dryers, and modern jet-air hand dryers. Of those three methods, only paper towels reduced the total number of bacteria on hands, with "through-air dried" towels the most effective.

The presenters also carried out tests to establish whether there was the potential for cross-contamination of other washroom users and the washroom environment as a result of each type of drying method. They found that:
 the jet air dryer, which blows air out of the unit at claimed speeds of 400 mph, was capable of blowing micro-organisms from the hands and the unit and potentially contaminating other washroom users and the washroom environment up to 2 metres away
 use of a warm air hand dryer spread micro-organisms up to 0.25 metres from the dryer
 paper towels showed no significant spread of micro-organisms.

In 2005, in a study conducted by TUV Produkt und Umwelt, different hand drying methods were evaluated. The following changes in the bacterial count after drying the hands were observed:

Cleaning, Disinfection, Sterilization
The field of infection prevention describes a hierarchy of removal of microorganisms from surfaces including medical equipment and instruments.  Cleaning is the lowest level, accomplishing substantial removal.   Disinfection involves the removal of all pathogens other than bacterial spores. Sterilization is defined as the removal or destruction of ALL microorganisms including bacterial spores.

Cleaning
Cleaning is the first and simplest step in preventing the spread of infection via surfaces and fomites.  Cleaning reduces microbial burden by chemical deadsorption of organisms (loosening bioburden/organisms from surfaces via cleaning chemicals), simple mechanical removal (rinsing, wiping), as well as disinfection (killing of organisms by cleaning chemicals). 

In order to reduce their chances to contract an infection, individuals are recommended to maintain a good hygiene by washing their hands after every contact with questionable areas or bodily fluids and by disposing of garbage at regular intervals to prevent germs from growing.

Disinfection
Disinfection uses liquid chemicals on surfaces and at room temperature to kill disease causing microorganisms. Ultraviolet light has also been used to disinfect the rooms of patients infected with Clostridium difficile after discharge. Disinfection is less effective than sterilization because it does not kill bacterial endospores.

Along with ensuring proper hand washing techniques are followed, another major component to decrease the spread of disease is sanitation of all medical equipment. The ANA and AANA set guidelines for sterilization and disinfection based on the Spaulding Disinfection and Sterilization Classification Scheme (SDSCS). The SDSCS classifies sterilization techniques into three categories: critical, semi-critical, and non-critical. For critical situations, or situations involving contact with sterile tissue or the vascular system, sterilize devices with sterilants that destroy all bacteria, rinse with sterile water, and use chemical germicides. In semi-critical situations, or situations with contact of mucous membranes or non-intact skin, high-level disinfectants are required. Cleaning and disinfecting devices with high-level disinfectants, rinsing with sterile water, and drying all equipment surfaces to prevent microorganism growth are methods nurses and doctors must follow. For non-critical situations, or situations involving electronic devices, stethoscopes, blood pressure cuffs, beds, monitors and other general hospital equipment, intermediate level disinfection is required. "Clean all equipment between patients with alcohol, use protective covering for non-critical surfaces that are difficult to clean, and hydrogen peroxide gas. . .for reusable items that are difficult to clean."

Sterilization
Sterilization is a process intended to kill all microorganisms and is the highest level of microbial kill that is possible.

Sterilization, if performed properly, is an effective way of preventing Infections from spreading. It should be used for the cleaning of  medical instruments and any type of medical item that comes into contact with the blood stream and sterile tissues.

There are four main ways in which such items are usually sterilized: autoclave (by using high-pressure steam), dry heat (in an oven), by using chemical sterilants such as glutaraldehydes or formaldehyde solutions or by exposure to ionizing radiation. The first two are the most widely used methods of sterilization mainly because of their accessibility and availability. Steam sterilization is one of the most effective types of sterilizations, if done correctly which is often hard to achieve. Instruments that are used in health care facilities are usually sterilized with this method. The general rule in this case is that in order to perform an effective sterilization, the steam must get into contact with all the surfaces that are meant to be disinfected. On the other hand, dry heat sterilization, which is performed with the help of an oven, is also an accessible type of sterilization, although it can only be used to disinfect instruments that are made of metal or glass. The very high temperatures needed to perform sterilization in this way are able to melt the instruments that are not made of glass or metal.

Effectiveness of the sterilizer, for example a steam autoclave is determined in three ways.
First, mechanical indicators and gauges on the machine itself indicate proper operation of the machine. Second heat sensitive indicators or tape on the sterilizing bags change color which indicate proper levels of heat or steam. And, third (most importantly) is biological testing in which a microorganism that is highly heat and chemical resistant (often the bacterial endospore) is selected as the standard challenge. If the process kills this microorganism, the sterilizer is considered to be effective.

Steam sterilization is done at a temperature of 121 C (250 F) with a pressure of 209 kPa (~2atm). In these conditions, rubber items must be sterilized for 20 minutes, and wrapped items 134 C with pressure of 310 kPa for 7 minutes. The time is counted once the temperature that is needed has been reached. Steam sterilization requires four conditions in order to be efficient: adequate contact, sufficiently high temperature, correct time and sufficient moisture. Sterilization using steam can also be done at a temperature of 132 C (270 F), at a double pressure. 

Dry heat sterilization is performed at 170 C (340 F) for one hour or two hours at a temperature of 160 C (320 F). Dry heat sterilization can also be performed at 121 C, for at least 16 hours.

Chemical sterilization, also referred to as cold sterilization, can be used to sterilize instruments that cannot normally be disinfected through the other two processes described above. The items sterilized with cold sterilization are usually those that can be damaged by regular sterilization. A variety of chemicals can be used including aldehydes, hydrogen peroxide, and peroxyacetic acid.   Commonly, glutaraldehydes and formaldehyde are used in this process, but in different ways. When using the first type of disinfectant, the instruments are soaked in a 2–4% solution for at least 10 hours while a solution of 8% formaldehyde will sterilize the items in 24 hours or more. Chemical sterilization is generally more expensive than steam sterilization and therefore it is used for instruments that cannot be disinfected otherwise. After the instruments have been soaked in the chemical solutions, they must be rinsed with sterile water which will remove the residues from the disinfectants. This is the reason why needles and syringes are not sterilized in this way, as the residues left by the chemical solution that has been used to disinfect them cannot be washed off with water and they may interfere with the administered treatment. Although formaldehyde is less expensive than glutaraldehydes, it is also more irritating to the eyes, skin and respiratory tract and is classified as a potential carcinogen, so it is used much less commonly.

Ionizing radiation is typically used only for sterilizing items for which none of the above methods are practical, because of the risks involved in the process

Personal protective equipment

Personal protective equipment (PPE) is specialized clothing or equipment worn by a worker for protection against a hazard. The hazard in a health care setting is exposure to blood, saliva, or other bodily fluids or aerosols that may carry infectious materials such as Hepatitis C, HIV, or other blood borne or bodily fluid pathogen. PPE prevents contact with a potentially infectious material by creating a physical barrier between the potential infectious material and the healthcare worker.

The United States Occupational Safety and Health Administration (OSHA) requires the use of personal protective equipment (PPE) by workers to guard against blood borne pathogens if there is a reasonably anticipated exposure to blood or other potentially infectious materials.

Components of PPE include gloves, gowns, bonnets, shoe covers, face shields, CPR masks, goggles, surgical masks, and respirators. How many components are used and how the components are used is often determined by regulations or the infection control protocol of the facility in question, which in turn are derived from knowledge of the mechanism of transmission of the pathogen(s) of concern. Many or most of these items are disposable to avoid carrying infectious materials from one patient to another patient and to avoid difficult or costly disinfection. In the US, OSHA requires the immediate removal and disinfection or disposal of a worker's PPE prior to leaving the work area where exposure to infectious material took place. For health care professionals who may come into contact with highly infectious bodily fluids, using personal protective coverings on exposed body parts improves protection. Breathable personal protective equipment improves user-satisfaction and may offer a similar level of protection. In addition, adding tabs and other modifications to the protective equipment may reduce the risk of contamination during donning and doffing (putting on and taking off the equipment). Implementing an evidence-based donning and doffing protocol such as a one-step glove and gown removal technique, giving oral instructions while donning and doffing, double gloving, and the use of glove disinfection may also improve protection for health care professionals.

Guidelines set by the ANA and ANAA for proper use of disposable gloves include, removing and replacing gloves frequently and when they are contaminated, damaged, or in between treatment of multiple patients. When removing gloves, “grasp outer edge of glove near wrist, peel away from hand turning inside out, hold removed glove in opposite gloved hand, slide ungloved finger under wrist of gloved hand so finger is inside gloved area, peel off the glove from inside creating a ‘bag’ for both gloves, dispose of gloves in proper waste receptacle”.

The inappropriate use of PPE equipment such as gloves, has been linked to an increase in rates of the transmission of infection, and the use of such must be compatible with the other particular hand hygiene agents used. Research studies in the form of randomized controlled trials and simulation studies are needed to determine the most effective types of PPE for preventing the transmission of infectious diseases to healthcare workers.  There is low quality evidence that supports making improvements or modifications to personal protective equipment in order to help decrease contamination. Examples of modifications include adding tabs to masks or gloves to ease removal and designing protective gowns so that gloves are removed at the same time. In addition, there is weak evidence that the following PPE approaches or techniques may lead to reduced contamination and improved compliance with PPE protocols: Wearing double gloves, following specific doffing (removal) procedures such as those from the CDC, and providing people with spoken instructions while removing PPE.

Antimicrobial surfaces

Microorganisms are known to survive on non-antimicrobial inanimate 'touch' surfaces (e.g., bedrails, over-the-bed trays, call buttons, bathroom hardware, etc.) for extended periods of time. This can be especially troublesome in hospital environments where patients with immunodeficiencies are at enhanced risk for contracting nosocomial infections.

Products made with antimicrobial copper alloy (brasses, bronzes, cupronickel, copper-nickel-zinc, and others) surfaces destroy a wide range of microorganisms in a short period of time.
The United States Environmental Protection Agency has approved the registration of 355 different antimicrobial copper alloys and one synthetic copper-infused hard surface that kill E. coli O157:H7, methicillin-resistant Staphylococcus aureus (MRSA), Staphylococcus, Enterobacter aerogenes, and Pseudomonas aeruginosa in less than 2 hours of contact. Other investigations have demonstrated the efficacy of antimicrobial copper alloys to destroy
Clostridium difficile, influenza A virus, adenovirus, and fungi. As a public hygienic measure in addition to regular cleaning, antimicrobial copper alloys are being installed in healthcare facilities in the UK, Ireland, Japan, Korea, France, Denmark, and Brazil. The synthetic hard surface is being installed in the United States as well as in Israel.

Vaccination of health care workers
Health care workers may be exposed to certain infections in the course of their work. Vaccines are available to provide some protection to workers in a healthcare setting. Depending on regulation, recommendation, the specific work function, or personal preference, healthcare workers or first responders may receive vaccinations for hepatitis B; influenza; measles, mumps and rubella; Tetanus, diphtheria, pertussis; N. meningitidis; and varicella.

Surveillance for infections

Surveillance is the act of infection investigation using the CDC definitions.  Determining the presence of a hospital acquired infection requires an infection control practitioner (ICP) to review a patient's chart and see if the patient had the signs and symptom of an infection. Surveillance definitions exist for infections of the bloodstream, urinary tract, pneumonia, surgical sites and gastroenteritis.

Surveillance traditionally involved significant manual data assessment and entry in order to assess preventative actions such as isolation of patients with an infectious disease. Increasingly, computerized software solutions are becoming available that assess incoming risk messages from microbiology and other online sources. By reducing the need for data entry, software can reduce the data workload of ICPs, freeing them to concentrate on clinical surveillance.

As of 1998, approximately one third of healthcare acquired infections were preventable. Surveillance and preventative activities are increasingly a priority for hospital staff. The Study on the Efficacy of Nosocomial Infection Control (SENIC) project by the U.S. CDC found in the 1970s that hospitals reduced their nosocomial infection rates by approximately 32 per cent by focusing on surveillance activities and prevention efforts.

Isolation and quarantine

In healthcare facilities, medical isolation refers to various physical measures taken to interrupt nosocomial spread of contagious diseases. Various forms of isolation exist, and are applied depending on the type of infection and agent involved, and its route of transmission, to address the likelihood of spread via airborne particles or droplets, by direct skin contact, or via contact with body fluids.

In cases where infection is merely suspected, individuals may be quarantined until the incubation period has passed and the disease manifests itself or the person remains healthy. Groups may undergo quarantine, or in the case of communities, a cordon sanitaire may be imposed to prevent infection from spreading beyond the community, or in the case of protective sequestration, into a community. Public health authorities may implement other forms of social distancing, such as school closings, when needing to control an epidemic.

Barriers and facilitators of implementing infection prevention and control guidelines 
Barriers to the ability of healthcare workers to follow PPE and infection control guidelines include communication of the guidelines, workplace support (manager support), the culture of use at the workplace, adequate training, the amount of physical space in the facility, access to PPE, and healthcare worker motivation to provide good patient care.

Facilitators include the importance of including all the staff in a facility (healthcare workers and support staff) should be done when guidelines are implemented.

Outbreak investigation

When an unusual cluster of illness is noted, infection control teams undertake an investigation to determine whether there is a true disease outbreak, a pseudo-outbreak (a result of contamination within the diagnostic testing process), or just random fluctuation in the frequency of illness.  If a true outbreak is discovered, infection control practitioners try to determine what permitted the outbreak to occur, and to rearrange the conditions to prevent ongoing propagation of the infection.  Often, breaches in good practice are responsible, although sometimes other factors (such as construction) may be the source of the problem.

Outbreaks investigations have more than a single purpose. These investigations are carried out in order to prevent additional cases in the current outbreak, prevent future outbreaks, learn about a new disease or learn something new about an old disease. Reassuring the public, minimizing the economic and social disruption as well as teaching epidemiology are some other obvious objectives of outbreak investigations.

According to the WHO, outbreak investigations are meant to detect what is causing the outbreak, how the pathogenic agent is transmitted, where it all started from, what is the carrier, what is the population at risk of getting infected and what are the risk factors.

Training in infection control and health care epidemiology
Practitioners can come from several different educational streams. Many begin as nurses, some as medical technologists (particularly in clinical microbiology), and some as physicians (typically infectious disease specialists). Specialized training in infection control and health care epidemiology are offered by the professional organizations described below. Physicians who desire to become infection control practitioners often are trained in the context of an infectious disease fellowship. Training that is conducted "face to face", via a computer, or via video conferencing may help improve compliance and reduce errors when compared with "folder based" training (providing health care professionals with written information or instructions).

In the United States, Certification Board of Infection Control and Epidemiology is a private company that certifies infection control practitioners based on their educational background and professional experience, in conjunction with testing their knowledge base with standardized exams. The credential awarded is CIC, Certification in Infection Control and Epidemiology.  It is recommended that one has 2 years of Infection Control experience before applying for the exam.  Certification must be renewed every five years.

A course in hospital epidemiology (infection control in the hospital setting) is offered jointly each year by the Centers for Disease Control and Prevention (CDC) and the Society for Healthcare Epidemiology of America.

Standardization

Australia 
In 2002, the Royal Australian College of General Practitioners published a revised standard for office-based infection control which covers the sections of managing immunisation, sterilisation and disease surveillance. However, the document on the personal hygiene of health workers is only limited to hand hygiene, waste and linen management, which may not be sufficient since some of the pathogens are air-borne and could be spread through air flow.

Since 1 November 2019, the Australian Commission on Safety and Quality in Health Care has managed the Hand Hygiene initiative in Australia, an initiative focused on improving hand hygiene practices to reduce the incidence of healthcare-associated infections.

United States 
Currently, the federal regulation that describes infection control standards, as related to occupational exposure to potentially infectious blood and other materials, is found at 29 CFR Part 1910.1030 Bloodborne pathogens.

See also 
 
 Wong, P., & Lim, W. Y. (2020). Aligning difficult airway guidelines with the anesthetic   COVID-19 guidelines to develop a COVID-19 difficult airway strategy: A narrative review. Journal of Anesthesia, 34(6), 924-943. https://doi.org/10.1007/s00540-020-02819-2

References

External links 
 Association for Professionals in Infection Control and Epidemiology is primarily composed of infection prevention and control professionals with nursing or medical technology backgrounds
 The Society for Healthcare Epidemiology of America is more heavily weighted towards practitioners who are physicians or doctoral-level epidemiologists.
 Regional Infection Control Networks
 The Certification Board of Infection Control and Epidemiology, Inc.
 Association for Professionals in Infection Control and Epidemiology

Epidemiology
Medical hygiene
Infectious diseases